Order of the Hero of Socialist Labour ( / ,) was the fourth highest state decoration awarded in Yugoslavia. It was awarded to Yugoslav citizens, companies and sports teams for outstanding achievements in their professional work. The order was awarded a total of 121 times until 1987. After the Breakup of Yugoslavia the decoration was discontinued.

Along with the order, the recipient was awarded the title of Hero of Socialist Labour ( / ,).

History
The Order of the Hero of Socialist Labour was formally established on 8 December 1948 as the Yugoslav equivalent to the Soviet title of Hero of Socialist Labour. The order was officially bestowed by the President of Yugoslavia.

First recipient of the order was Moša Pijade, in 1949. Only two people were awarded the order twice - Edvard Kardelj (in 1955 and posthumously in 1979) and Đuro Pucar (in 1955 and posthumously in 1979). Five women received the award - Spasenija Cana Babović, Anka Berus, Lidija Šentjurc, Vida Tomšič and Ida Sabo. The only foreigner who received the award was President of Romania and General Secretary of the Romanian Communist Party, Nicolae Ceaușescu, who received the award in January 1978.

Recipients
The Order was awarded a total of 121 times until 1987. Some of the notable recipients are:

 Ivo Andrić (1972)
 Ljupčo Arsov (1970)
 Vladimir Bakarić (1961)
 Džemal Bijedić (1977)
 Emerik Blum (1984)
 Josip Broz Tito (1950)
 Nicolae Ceaușescu (1978)
 Rodoljub Čolaković (1960)
 Oskar Davičo (1978)
 Peko Dapčević (1981)
 Stane Dolanc (1979)
 Veselin Đuranović (1985)
 Ivan Gošnjak (1961)
 Fadil Hoxha (1975)
 Blažo Jovanović (1961)
 Edvard Kardelj (1955, 1979)
 Boris Kidrič (1950)
 Rudi Kolak (1978)
 Lazar Koliševski (1961)
 Sergej Kraigher (1974)
 Miroslav Krleža (1953)
 Vicko Krstulović (1972)
 Mihailo Lalić (1979)
 Nikola Ljubičić (1976)
 Ivan Maček (1968)
 Branko Mamula (1985)
 Cvijetin Mijatović (1973)
 Veljko Milatović (1981)
 Miloš Minić (1971)
 Kosta Nađ (1971)
 Đorđije Pajković (1972)
 Branko Pešić (1986)
 Moša Pijade (1949) 
 Koča Popović (1968)
 Milentije Popović (1971)
 Hamdija Pozderac (1983)
 Đuro Pucar (1959, 1979)
 Aleksandar Ranković (1954)
 Ivan Ribar (1961)
 Mitja Ribičič (1979)
 Đuro Salaj (1956)
 Pavle Savić (1978)
 Ali Shukriu
 Alija Sirotanović
 Mika Špiljak (1976)
 Petar Stambolić (1961)
 Borko Temelkovski (1979)
 Josip Vidmar (1960)
 Veljko Vlahović (1961)
 Radovan Vlajković (1982)
 Svetozar Vukmanović (1961)
 Vidoje Žarković (1987)

See also
Orders, decorations, and medals of SFR Yugoslavia

References

Orders, decorations, and medals of Yugoslavia
Awards established in 1948
1948 establishments in Yugoslavia
1987 disestablishments in Yugoslavia
Awards disestablished in 1987
Hero (title)